Libido is a 1973 Australian drama film comprising 4 segments written and directed as independent stories, but screened together as one piece, exploring a common theme of instinctive desire and contemporary sexuality.

John B. Murray directed the segment called "The Husband", written by Craig McGregor, Tim Burstall directed "The Child", from a screenplay by Hal Porter, Fred Schepisi directed Thomas Keneally's "The Priest" and David Baker directed playwright David Williamson's screenplay for "The Family Man".

Plot
The four segments of the film average about 30 minutes in length and are presented in the following order.
 Part 1: "The Husband" - Focuses on a suburban husband and wife, their relationship and their sexual fantasies.
 Part 2: "The Child" - A lonely boy seeks revenge on a man he finds engaging in intercourse with his beloved governess.
 Part 3: "The Priest" - A priest contemplates leaving the church as a result of his indefatigable attraction to a nun.
 Part 4: "The Family Man" - The husband of a woman in labor arranges with a friend to take two women to a secluded beach house.

Cast
"The Husband"
Elke Neidhardt as Penelope
Bryon Williams as Jonathon
Mark Albiston as Harold
"The Child"
John Williams as Martin
Jill Forster as mother
Judy Morris as Sybil
Bruce Barry as David
Louise Homfrey
George Fairfax
"The Priest"
Robyn Nevin as Sister Caroline
Arthur Dignam as Father Burn
Vivean Frau
Vicki Bray
Valma Pratt
Penne Hackforth-Jones
"The Family Man"
Jack Thompson as Ken
Max Gillies as Gerald
Debbie Nankervis
Suzanne Brady

Production
The film arose from a series of workshops held in 1971 by the Victorian Branch of the Producers and Directors Guild to help writers work in narrative cinema. Professional writers were invited to prepare short stories on the theme of love which were adapted and produced by members of the Guild. Four of them were linked in the film.

Tim Burstall wanted to direct the David Williamson segment but because he had worked with Williamson before was given the Hal Porter one, originally called The Jetty. Burstall made some key changes to the story to make it more autobiographical and work better for film. It was shot at Werribee Park Estate in June 1972.

All the stories were shot and filmed in and around Melbourne on 16mm for a budget of $100,000, including $26,000 from the Australian Council for the Arts. According to Burstall, the episodes directed by Murray, Baker and Schepisi cost about $7,000 each and his cost $13,000 - although he says the true cost, accounting for deferrals, was closer to $23,000. He says the total cost of shooting the film was $75,000 being $120,000 after deferrals.

British Empire Films later added some funds to enable the film to be blown up to 35mm (some sources say $20,000 others $36,000).

Release
The film was a popular success in Australia and screened overseas. Within two years of the film's release all deferred fees had been paid back. However, when the film screened in Spain, the segment "The Priest" had to be cut.

By 1979 Burstall estimated the film had returned between $60,000 and $75,000 to the producers.

Awards
In 1973, the film won the Golden Reel Award for best fiction film from the Australian Film Institute for the segment The Child, and Judy Morris won the best actress award for her performance in the same segment.

Proposed sequel
Burstall said there was meant to be a follow up film called The Bed, consisting of four stories revolving around the bed, written by Alan Marshall, Morris Lurie, John Powers and Max Richards, to be directed by Mal Bryning, Ross Dimsey, Simon Wincer and Rod Kinnear. However, they could not raise the money to make it.

References

External links
 
Libido at Oz Movies

1973 films
Australian drama films
Films directed by Fred Schepisi
Films scored by Bruce Smeaton
1970s English-language films